Come Clean is a Canadian television documentary film, directed by Neil Graham and Derreck Roemer and released in 2022. The film profiles several drug addicts who are in rehabilitation at the Westover Treatment Centre in Thamesville, Ontario.

The film premiered on January 25, 2022, on TVOntario.

The film was a nominee for the Donald Brittain Award for best social or political television documentary at the 11th Canadian Screen Awards in 2023.

References

External links

2022 films
2022 documentary films
Canadian documentary television films
English-language Canadian films
Documentary films about drug addiction
2020s Canadian films